One Hand Can't Clap is a 2003 Czech comedy film directed by David Ondříček.

Cast and characters
 Jiří Macháček as Standa
 Ivan Trojan as Zdenek
 Marek Taclík as Ondrej
 Klára Pollertová as Sandra
 Isabela Bencová as Martina
 Kristína Lukešová as Andrea
 David Matásek as Jan
 Vladimír Dlouhý as Martina's father
 Jan Tříska as Standa's father

References

External links
 

2003 comedy films
2003 films
Czech Lion Awards winners (films)
Czech comedy films
2000s Czech-language films
2000s Czech films